Roberto Gatti (born 20 October 1964) is a retired Italian football defender and later manager.

References

1964 births
Living people
Italian footballers
FC Lugano players
FC Chiasso players
Swiss Super League players
Association football defenders
Italian football managers
FC Chiasso managers